Katya Santos (born 1981/1982) is a Filipino actress and model. She started her career on the Philippine television series Ang TV and Oki Doki Doc at the age of 13. Since then she has become a sex symbol in the Philippine cinema having signed with the "Viva Hot Babes", an entertainment company based in Manila, which is also affiliated with other actresses such as Maui Taylor, Gwen Garci and Andrea del Rosario. Perhaps she is known for her role as Carla in the drama series Anna Karenina which ran in 1996-2002 and in the afternoon drama series Dangal where she played Iyanna Salve previously aired on GMA Network.

She was born in Manila and graduated with a degree in Business Administration. Katya used to work as a sales consultant for a security systems corporation.

Santos has also been a long time Viva Contract artist with other Viva Hotbabes Andrea del Rosario and Maui Taylor in 2011 they also reunited for a FHM Photo shoot and reunion as VIVA Hotbabes sexiest she will also be hosting a new reality-TV program called Pantasya X or Fantasy X for the search for the next sexy star on VIVA TV.

Filmography

Television

Film

References

External links
 
 

Filipino child actresses
Filipino television actresses
Filipino female models
Star Magic
Living people
ABS-CBN personalities
People from Manila
1980s births